Kalkan-e Aftabru (also Romanized as Kalkān-e Āftābrū and Kalkān-e Āftāb Row) is a village in Horr Rural District, Dinavar District, Sahneh County, Kermanshah Province, Iran. At the 2006 census, its population was 91, in 23 families.

References 

Populated places in Sahneh County